Trimble Township is one of the fourteen townships of Athens County, Ohio, United States. The 2010 census found 4,480 people in the township, 1,818 of whom lived in the unincorporated portions of the township.

Geography
Located in the far northern part of the county, it borders the following townships:
Monroe Township, Perry County - north
Homer Township, Morgan County - east
Ames Township - southeast corner
Dover Township - south
York Township - southwest corner
Ward Township, Hocking County - west
Coal Township, Perry County - northwest corner

The farthest north township in Athens County, it is the only county township to border Perry County.

Three villages are located in eastern Trimble Township: Glouster in the north, Trimble in the centre, and Jacksonville in the south.

Name and history
Trimble Township was organized in 1827. Named for Allen Trimble, Governor of Ohio, it is the only Trimble Township statewide.

Government
The township is governed by a three-member board of trustees, who are elected in November of odd-numbered years to a four-year term beginning on the following January 1. Two are elected in the year after the presidential election and one is elected in the year before it. There is also an elected township fiscal officer, who serves a four-year term beginning on April 1 of the year after the election, which is held in November of the year before the presidential election. Vacancies in the fiscal officership or on the board of trustees are filled by the remaining trustees.

References

External links
County website

Townships in Athens County, Ohio
Townships in Ohio
1827 establishments in Ohio
Populated places established in 1827